Tom Earle (born February 12, 1966) is a Canadian author and teacher. He is also a former ice hockey player.

Hockey
He has played for many teams, such as Orillia Travelways, Barrie Colts, Dartmouth College and the Whitley Bay Warriors.

Career statistics

Books
He has written two books to date.

 The Hat Trick, 2010, 
  Home Ice Advantage, 2013,

Personal life

He has 3 children and one dog, his kids names are Nicolas, Lindsay and their youngest Lucas. Their dogs name is Maggie. 
He is married to Janet; she is also a teacher.

References

Canadian children's writers
Dartmouth Big Green men's ice hockey players
Living people
People from Orillia
1966 births